Wilhelm Wackernagel (23 April 1806, Berlin – 21 December 1869, Basel) was a German-Swiss philologist specializing in Germanic studies. He was the father of Indo-Europeanist Jacob Wackernagel.

He studied Classical and Germanic literature at the University of Berlin as a pupil of August Boeckh and Karl Lachmann. In 1833 he moved to Basel, where from 1835 to 1869, he was a professor of German language and literature at the university. While at Basel, he turned down offers for professorships in Berlin, Munich, Tübingen and Vienna.

Works 
He was considered the leading Germanist after the death of Jacob Grimm in 1863. A number of Wackernagel's significant works were published posthumously. The following are some of his principal writings:
 Geschichte des deutschen Hexameters und Pentameters bis auf Klopstock, 1831 – History of German hexameters and pentameters prior to Klopstock.
 Gedichte Walthers von der Vogelweide (edited with Karl Joseph Simrock) – Poetry of Walther von der Vogelweide.
 Deutsches Lesebuch, 1835–1843 (3 volumes) – German basal reader.
 Geschichte der deutschen Litteratur : ein Handbuch, 1848-1855 – History of German literature.
 Die deutsche glasmalerei: Geschichtlicher entwurf mit belegen, 1855 – German stained glass; historical design.
 Kleinere Schriften von Wilhelm Wackernagel, 1872 – Smaller writings.
 Poetik, Rhetorik und Stilistik: Academische Vorlesungen, 1873 (edited by Ludwig Sieber) – Poetics, rhetoric and stylistics; Academic lectures.
 Johann Fischart von Strassburg, 1874 – monograph on Johann Fischart.
 Altdeutsches handwörterbuch, 1878 (edited by Maximilian Rieger) – Old German dictionary.
 Kleineres altdeutsches Lesebuch, 1880 – Smaller Old German basal reader.

References

External links
 
 

1806 births
1869 deaths
Writers from Berlin
Swiss philologists
Germanic studies scholars
Linguists of Germanic languages
Humboldt University of Berlin alumni
Academic staff of the University of Basel
Linguists from Germany